Mak Wilson (born 3 September 1957) is a now retired English puppeteer, writer, CG animation director, and mocap artist. He is also known as Mac Wilson and Malcolm Wilson.

Early life and career
Wilson was born in Consett, England, but grew up in nearby Stanley, County Durham. He began his professional career in 1973 at the age of 15, but his screen physical performer and puppeteering work started in 1981 with The Dark Crystal. Wilson had previously toured on stage where he often did mime, mask and puppeteering.

From 1990 he became head puppeteer and creative advisor for the London Jim Henson's Creature Shop, but when it closed down in 2005 Mak Wilson began freelancing and worked extensively with the BBC.
He was forced to retire in 2014 after his longstanding M.E./C.F.S. became too severe for him to continue. He now spends his time writing on the subjects of King Arthur and the ‘Dark Ages’ in general.

Filmography

Film
 Muppets Most Wanted - UK principle puppeteer
 The Hitchhiker's Guide to the Galaxy - Vogon Interpreter (voice)
 Mee-Shee: The Water Giant - CGI animation director and CGI realtime puppeteer
 Buddy - animatronic face puppeteer of Buddy
 Doctor Dolittle - animatronic puppetry advisor
 Lost In Space - CGI animation director and CGI realtime puppeteer
 Muppet Treasure Island - CGI realtime puppeteer and singer
 The Adventures of Pinocchio - Lead animatronic puppeteer
 Loch Ness - Animatronic and CGI realtime puppeteer
 Babe - Lead animatronic puppeteer and coordinator
 Who Framed Roger Rabbit - FX puppeteer
 Teenage Mutant Ninja Turtles II: The Secret of the Ooze - Lead animatronic puppeteer of Michelangelo, coordinator and the Promoter's Aide
 Teenage Mutant Ninja Turtles (1990 film) - Lead animatronic puppeteer of Michelangelo
 The Bear - Lead animatronic puppeteer and coordinator
 Little Shop of Horrors - Audrey II lipsync puppeteer and Little Audrey II's vocal effects
 Santa Claus: The Movie - Lead animatronic puppeteer of Donna
 Labyrinth - Animatronic face puppeteer of Hoggle, Brickkeeper, Riding Goblin, Shaft of Hands, Goblins
 Return to Oz - Performer of Billina the chicken
 Greystoke - Performer of the ape Figs and vocals of the mother ape Karla
 The Dark Crystal - Stand-in performer of Scribe the Mystic

Television
 The Furchester Hotel - Harvey P. Dull, Guest characters and Puppeteer Captain  - CBeebies/Sesame Street production
 Mr. Bloom's Nursery - Colin the runner bean and Tom the potato 
 CBBC presentation guests - puppeteer of a mad rabbit, a wacky octopus and reindeer 
 ABC Bear - The Bear and puppet choreographer - Austria
 Mongrels - Guest characters
 Dr. Who - Movement choreographer for Helen McCrory
 X-Factor with The Muppets - puppet choreographer and puppeteer
 2007 Brit Awards - Opening of the event with the Scissor Sisters - puppet choreographer
 2005 Brit Awards - Opening of the event with the Scissor Sisters - puppet choreographer
 Fur TV - puppeteer of Lapeno
 Jack and the Beanstalk-the True Story - animatronic puppeteer and CGI animation director
 Farscape - animatronic puppetry teacher
 Saturday Night Takeaway - puppeteer assistant to Kermit the Frog
 Fungus the Bogeyman - Fungus (through MoCap)
 The Hoobs - consultant, OB director, puppet choreographer, puppeteer
 Mopatop's Shop - Mopatop (1999-2001)
 "Bits and Bobs" - Developer, Puppet Director
 Construction Site - Lug the Dump Truck, Scooch the Dump Truck - Director and co producer
 Dinosaurs - Face/Head Operation of Earl Sinclair (Seasons 2-4)
 Jim Henson's Animal Show - Yves St. La Roache (1994), Achilles the Shark, Billy Bob the Lemur, Bosko the Baboon, Chauncey the Sea Turtle, Chaz the Chameleon, Chuck the Lion, Clive the Kiwi, Cool the Kangaroo Rat, Dooley the Armadillo, Flora the Koala, Fluke the Dolphin, Harry the Rhinoceros, Leapovitch the Frog, Morton the Beaver, Nippy the Tiger Beetle, Plunk the Sea Otter, Ringo the Elephant, Robert the Red Deer, Sean the Rabbit, Swifty the Cheetah, Victor the Rattlesnake
 Jim Henson's Mother Goose Stories - Various
 The Ghost of Faffner Hall - Farkus Faffner
 The Storyteller - Various Creature Performances

Listed as ‘Crew’ but actually puppeteer
 Buddy - Animatronic puppeteer and Puppetry Coordinator
 Construction Site - Lead Puppeteer
 Dr. Dolittle - Animatronic puppetry teacher
 Fur TV - Puppeteer
 Jack and the Beanstalk: The Real Story - Lead Puppeteer
 Jim Henson's Mother Goose Stories - Puppet Coordinator
 Labyrinth - Goblin Performer, Puppeteer
 Little Shop of Horrors - Principal Puppeteer
 Loch Ness - Lead Puppeteer
 Lost in Space - "Blawp" animation supervisor
 Mee-Shee: The Water Giant - Animation Director, CGI Puppeteer
 Mongrels - Puppeteer
 Teenage Mutant Ninja Turtles II: The Secret of the Ooze - Face Operation of Michelangelo
 The Adventures of Pinocchio - Lead Puppeteer
 The Bear - Lead Puppeteer
 The Dark Crystal - Part-Time Puppeteer on the Mystics
 The Hitchhiker's Guide to the Galaxy - Puppeteer
 The Hoobs - Creative Consultant

References

External links
 

British puppeteers
1957 births
Living people
Muppet performers